The 2009 Marshall Thundering Herd football team represented Marshall University in the 2009 NCAA Division I FBS football season. Marshall competed as a member of the East Division of Conference USA, and played their home games at Joan C. Edwards Stadium.  The Thundering Herd finished the season 7–6 overall and 4–4 in Conference USA play.  They were invited to the Little Caesars Pizza Bowl, where they defeated Ohio, 21–17.

On November 29, it was announced that Mark Snyder had resigned as head coach.  Defensive coordinator Rick Minter was elevated to interim head coach for the bowl game. Marshall hired Doc Holliday as Snyder's permanent replacement.

Schedule

Game summaries

Southern Illinois

Brian Anderson threw for 316 yards and three touchdowns to lead Marshall to a 31-28 win over Southern Illinois. Chuck Walker had 119 yards on 10 catches, while Cody Slate caught nine passes for 114 yards and two touchdowns for the Thundering Herd. Marshall gained 388 yards of total offense in the season opener. The Salukis, who had three turnovers, brought the game within 31-28 with 1:40 left on a 5-yard run by Chris Dieker. Marshall recovered the Salukis' onside kick to win for the first time in three meetings between the two teams.

External link: http://sports.espn.go.com/ncf/recap?gameId=292480276

Virginia Tech

The Hokies sported an unusual look in their home opener—all-white uniforms and a throwback helmet with a white "V" below a red "T." The helmet paid tribute to Frank Loria, a Hokies safety in the 1960s who later became an assistant coach with the Thundering Herd and died in the 1970 Marshall plane crash. Virginia Tech's white uniforms caused another unusual sight. Marshall, according to school officials, wore all-green on the road for what was believed to be the first time in modern school history.

Marshall's highlights came from two players who returned after serving one-game suspensions for drug arrests. Tailback Darius Marshall had a 61-yard touchdown run and finished with 109 yards rushing, and cornerback DeQuan Bembry had the diving interception in the end zone.

External link: http://sports.espn.go.com/ncf/recap?gameId=292550259

Bowling Green

Darius Marshall rushed for 186 yards, including an 80-yard touchdown run, to lead Marshall to a 17-10 win over Bowling Green.

The Thundering Herd trailed 7-0 at halftime after Bowling Green's Chris Wright caught a 50-yard touchdown pass from Tyler Sheehan, who completed 43-of-62 passes for 383 yards.
But Marshall answered with 17 straight points and never fell behind again. Brian Anderson connected with Antavio Wilson on an 11-yard touchdown, Marshall scored on his long run and Craig Ratanamorn made a 31-yard field goal.

External link: http://espn.go.com/ncf/recap?gameId=292620276

Memphis

Darius Marshall ran for three touchdowns to help Marshall hold off Memphis 27-16 in the Conference USA opener for both teams. Marshall had 25 carries for 203 yards for the Thundering Herd, and also completed a pass for 27 yards.

With the Tigers leading 7-3 after the opening quarter, Marshall ran for touchdowns of 2 and 69 yards to take a 17-7 lead late in the second.
Matt Reagan kicked a 20-yard field goal to end the first half, then started the second with a 22-yarder to bring Memphis back within 17-13. Marshall ran it in from 5 yards out to give the Herd a 24-13 advantage to start the fourth. Craig Ratanamorn kicked an 18-yard field goal to seal the win for Marshall.

External link: http://espn.go.com/ncf/recap?gameId=292690235

East Carolina

East Carolina's Dominique Lindsay broke a 7-7 tie before halftime with a 3-yard touchdown run. Marshall pulled ahead 17-14 on Craig Ratanamorn's 28-yard field goal and Darius Marshall's 20-yard TD run in the third, setting up Patrick Pinkney's game-winning run. The Pirates defense held strong in the fourth, as Marshall's Brian Anderson was intercepted early in the fourth by Emanuel Davis and again late by Jeremy Chambliss to help seal the win.

External link: http://sports.espn.go.com/ncf/recap?gameId=292760276

Tulane

Ashton Hall ran 29 yards with a fumble recovery for the tiebreaking touchdown and Marshall kept Tulane out of the end zone for the final 56 minutes to take a 31-10 victory. The score was tied at 7-all when Albert McClellan forced a fumble by Tulane's Jeremy Williams and Hall picked up the football and ran into the end zone with 41 seconds left in the first quarter. The Thundering Herd, pulled away from there, using a goal-line stand and three more takeaways to hold the Green Wave in check and win for the third time in four games.

Marshall running back Darius Marshall rushed for a season-low 98 yards and two touchdowns on 20 carries.

External link: http://sports.espn.go.com/ncf/recap?gameId=292832655

West Virginia

West Virginia overcame its first halftime deficit of the season to improve to 9-0 against Marshall in the series between the state's only Football Bowl Subdivision teams.

Jarrett Brown took a helmet-to-helmet hit on West Virginia's first series and did not return. Coach Bill Stewart said afterward he didn't know the extent of Brown's injury.

Noel Devine outdueled Marshall's Darius Marshall in a matchup between two of the nation's top three rushers, although both players struggled to find running room on a cold and wet afternoon. Devine was held 23 yards below his third-best average. Marshall, whose 146-yard average ranked second to Fresno State's Ryan Mathews's 148, was limited to 82 yards.

External link: http://sports.espn.go.com/ncf/recap?gameId=292900277

UAB

Brian Anderson threw for 315 yards and two touchdowns to lead Marshall to a 27-7 victory over Alabama-Birmingham. Anderson was 25-for-38 for the Thundering Herd, finishing a yard short of his career-high 316 set in the season-opening win over Southern Illinois.

Anderson completed a 30-yard scoring pass to Cody Slate with 12:30 left in the second quarter, then hit Chuck Walker with a 15-yard pass to give Marshall a 17-0 lead with 1:43 left in the first half.

Darius Marshall added 133 yards on 32 carries with a 1-yard touchdown for his fifth 100-yard game of the season.

External link: http://sports.espn.go.com/ncf/recap?gameId=292970276

UCF

Brett Hodges threw a 1-yard touchdown pass to Rocky Ross with 23 seconds left and Nick Cattoi added the extra point to give UCF a 21-20 victory over Marshall.

UCF scored twice in the final 8 minutes to overcome a 20-7 deficit and beat Marshall for the fifth straight time.

TE Cody Slate was the top receiver for Marshall, hauling in five receptions for 80 yards. His touchdown in the second quarter marked the 23rd of his career, tying him for 5th all time with Josh Davis and Tim Martin. Aaron Dobson caught two balls for a career-high 75 yards. UCF wide receiver A.J. Guyton was the leading receiver in the game, catching the ball five times for 100 yards.

Darius Marshall rushed for 80 yards in the game, bringing his season total to 1,032. With the effort against UCF, Marshall surpassed the 1,000-yard mark for the second-straight year. He became the first Marshall running back to record consecutive 1,000-yard campaigns since Chris Park did so in 1994 and 1995. Mario Harvey was the top player on defense for the Herd, recording a game-high 11 tackles along with a sack.

External link: http://sports.espn.go.com/ncf/recap?gameId=293052116

Southern Miss

Southern Miss became bowl eligible for the eighth straight season and denied Marshall a chance at becoming bowl eligible for the first time under fifth-year coach Mark Snyder.

Marshall lost running back Darius Marshall and tight end Cody Slate, the team's top receiver, to leg injuries. Darius Marshall was limited to 22 yards on 11 carries. As a team, Marshall had 26 yards on 26 carries but outgained Southern Miss overall 363-294.

Southern Miss running back Damion Fletcher ran for 55 yards on 13 carries to move into 13th place on the Football Bowl Subdivision (FBS) all-time career rushing list ahead of Michigan's Mike Hart. Fletcher has 5,076 career rushing yards.

The game was played on the 39th anniversary of the plane crash that killed most of Marshall's football team. Marshall University held a memorial service a few hours before the game.

External link: http://sports.espn.go.com/ncf/recap?gameId=293180276

SMU

Brian Anderson threw two second-half touchdown passes to freshman Aaron Dobson to lead Marshall to a 34-31 win over SMU, making the Thundering Herd bowl eligible for the first time under fifth-year coach Mark Snyder.

Martin Ward ran for 136 yards and a score and Terrell Edwards-Maye added 113 yards for Marshall.

SMU fell into a first-place tie in the West Division with No. 24 Houston with one game remaining. Houston holds the tiebreaker after beating SMU 38-15 earlier this season.

External link: http://sports.espn.go.com/ncf/recap?gameId=293250276

UTEP

Trevor Vittatoe passed for 517 yards and five touchdowns as UTEP routed Marshall 52-21.

After leading 20-14 at the break, the Miners exploded in the second half, adding four touchdowns and a field goal while holding the Thundering Herd to just one touchdown.

Brian Anderson threw for 347 yards and three touchdowns for the Thundering Herd. Anderson found Aaron Dobson, Chuck Walker and Antavio Wilson for scores.

External link: http://sports.espn.go.com/ncf/recap?gameId=293322638

Ohio (Little Caesars Pizza Bowl)

Martin Ward's tackle-breaking run and powerful plunge along with a punt return gave Marshall a big lead over Ohio in the Little Caesars Pizza Bowl.

The game looked like it was going to be a rout when Ward's 2-yard run put Marshall ahead 21-0 with 7:21 left in the first half. He scored on a 12-yard run through more than a few defenders and Andre Booker had 58-yard punt return for a touchdown at the end of the quarter.

The Bobcats rallied to pull within four points late in the third quarter and had chances to complete the comeback in the fourth, missing a wide-open receiver on a trick play and failing to take advantage of their last two drives before losing 21-17 to Marshall.

DeQuan Bembry's interception with 40 seconds left sealed the victory for the Thundering Herd.

The schools, located 82 miles apart, played 52 times between 1905 and 2004 in "The Battle for the Bell," with the trophy symbolizing the Ohio River separating Ohio and West Virginia. They hadn't played since Marshall left the Mid-American Conference for Conference USA in 2005.

Sarah Thomas made history during the game, becoming the first woman to officiate a bowl game, according to a Little Caesars Bowl spokesman. She was the first woman to be an official for a major college football game in 2007 and is on the NFL's list of officiating prospects.

Roster

References

Marshall
Marshall Thundering Herd football seasons
Little Caesars Pizza Bowl champion seasons
Marshall Thundering Herd football